Maharajah Sir Jagatjit Singh Sahib Bahadur  (24 November 1872 – 19 June 1949) was the last ruling Maharaja of the princely state of Kapurthala in the British Empire of India, from 1877 until his death, in 1949. He ascended to the throne of Kapurthala state on 16 October 1877 and assumed full ruling powers on 24 November 1890 as well indulging in traveling the world and being a Francophile. He was born in an Ahluwalia Sikh family. He received the title of Maharaja in 1911. He built palaces and gardens in the city of Kapurthala; his main palace, Jagatjit Palace there was modelled on the Palace of Versailles. He also built a gurdwara at Sultanpur Lodhi.

He served as the Indian Representative to the League of Nations General Assembly in Geneva in 1925, 1927, and 1929, attended the Round Table Conference in 1931 and was Lt Governor of the PEPSU at the time of his death in 1949, aged 76. He was cousin of Sardar Bhagat Singh, one of the few Indian Justices of High Court during the British Raj. His grandson Sukhjit Singh served as a Brigadier in the Indian Army. Another grandson Arun Singh was a Minister in the Rajiv Gandhi government.

Honours

British 

Knight Grand Commander of the Order of the Star of India (GCSI) 1911 (KCSI: 1897)
Knight Grand Commander of the Order of the Indian Empire (GCIE) 1 January 1921
Knight Grand Cross of the Order of the British Empire (GBE) 29 November 1927
Queen Victoria Diamond Jubilee Medal in Gold 1897
Delhi Durbar Medal in Gold 1903
King George V Coronation Medal, with Delhi Durbar Clasp 1911
King George V Silver Jubilee Medal 1935
King George VI Coronation Medal 1937
Indian Independence Medal 1947

Foreign 

Grand Cross of the Order of the Crown, 1st Class of the Kingdom of Prussia 1911
Grand Cordon of the Order of the Nile of the Kingdom of Egypt 1924
Grand Cordon of the Sharifan Order of Alaoui of the Kingdom of Morocco 1924
Grand Cross of the Order of Saints Maurice and Lazarus of the Kingdom of Italy 1924
Grand Cross of the Order of Merit of Chile 1925
Grand Cross of the Order of the Sun of Peru 1925
Grand Cross of the Order of the Red Cross of Honour and Merit of Cuba 1925
Grand Cross of the Order of the Star of Romania 1926
Grand Cross of the Order of Menelik II of Empire of Ethiopia 1928
Grand Cross of the Order of Saint Sava of the Kingdom of Yugoslavia 1928
Grand Cross of the Order of Charles III of the Kingdom of Spain 1928
Grand Cordon of the Order of Glory of Tunisia 1928
Grand Cross of the Royal Order of Cambodia 1929 
Grand Cordon of the Order of the Crown of Empire of Iran 1930
Grand Cross of the Order of the White Lion, 1st Class of Czechoslovakia 1934
Grand Cross of the Order of Saint Agatha of San Marino 1935
Grand Cross of the Order of Saint Sylvester of the Vatican 1935
Grand Cross of the Legion of Honour of France 1948 (Grand Officer: 1924)
Grand Cross of the Hamidiya Order of Merit of the Rampur State 1926

Marriages

First marriage at Paprola, on 16 April 1886, to Maharani Harbans Kaur Sahiba, daughter of Mian Ranjit Singh Guleria of Paprola (died 17 October 1941 in Mussoorie from heart failure). They had two sons.
Paramjit Singh Sahib Bahadur 
Mahijit Singh Sahib Bahadur
Second marriage at Katoch, 1891, to Rani Parvati Kaur Sahiba, daughter of a Sardar of Katoch (died 20 February 1944 in Kapurthala). They had a son.
Amarjit Singh Sahib Bahadur
Third marriage at Bashahr, 1892, to Rani Lakshmi Kaur Sahiba, a Princess of a Rajput family from Bashahr (died September 1959 in Kapurthala).
Fourth marriage at Jubbal, 1895, to Rani Kanari Sahiba, daughter of the Dewan of Jubbal (died circa 1910). They had a son and a daughter.
Karamjit Singh Sahib Bahadur x Sita Devi
 Amrit Kaur Sahiba
Fifth marriage at Paris, 28 January 1908 (later divorced), to Rani Prem Kaur Sahiba [née Anita Delgado], (born 1890 in Málaga, Spain, died 7 July 1962 in Madrid, Spain from heart failure). They had a son.
Ajit Singh Sahib Bahadur
Sixth marriage at Kapurthala, 1942, to Rani Tara Devi Sahiba [née Eugenia Marie Grossupovai]; she was an actress, and the daughter of a Czech count and an actress.

In media

Probably as a reminiscence of his marriage to Anita Delgado, Don Pimpón, a character in the Spanish version of Sesame Street, claimed to have travelled the world extensively with "his friend the Maharaja of Kapurthala."
He appeared in the American Horror Story: Freak Show episode Orphans in a flashback where he gives Elsa Mars custody of Mahadevi "Ma Petite" Patel.

See also

 Rajkumari Bibiji Amrit Kaur, the first female Indian Cabinet Minister (his first cousin).

Footnotes

External links

 The history of Kapurthala is the history of the Ahluwalia Dynasty

1872 births
1949 deaths
Knights Grand Commander of the Order of the Star of India
Knights Grand Commander of the Order of the Indian Empire
Indian Knights Grand Cross of the Order of the British Empire
Grand Croix of the Légion d'honneur
Grand Crosses of the Order of the Sun of Peru
Grand Crosses of the Order of St. Sava
Grand Crosses of the Order of the White Lion
Grand Crosses of the Order of the Star of Romania
Knights Grand Cross of the Royal Order of Cambodia
Punjabi people
Indian Sikhs
Kapurthala, Jagatjit Singh
Knights Grand Cross of the Order of Saints Maurice and Lazarus
Rajpramukhs
Recipients of orders, decorations, and medals of Ethiopia